Derrendi is a heritage-listed residence at 30-32 Twynam Street, Narrandera, Narrandera Shire, New South Wales, Australia. It was added to the New South Wales State Heritage Register on 2 April 1999.

History 

Derrendi was designed by Ernest R. Laver and built in 1906.

It is associated with the locally significant Roach family.

Description

It is a red brick residence built in the Queen Anne/Federation style. The essential features of the building remain intact.

Heritage listing 

Derrendi was listed on the New South Wales State Heritage Register on 2 April 1999. It is also recognised on the Australian Institute of Architects' register of significant architecture in New South Wales.

See also

References

Attribution 

New South Wales State Heritage Register
Houses in New South Wales
Articles incorporating text from the New South Wales State Heritage Register
Narrandera